The 2009 season was Santos Futebol Clube's ninety-seventh season in existence and the club's fifty consecutive season in the top flight of Brazilian football.

Players

Squad information

Source:

Appearances and goals

Top scorers

Sources:

Disciplinary record

Transfers

In

Out

Out on loan

Kit

|

|

|

Official sponsorship

 Semp Toshiba
 Universo Tintas

Friendlies

Sources:

Competitions

Overall summary

Detailed overall summary
{|class="wikitable" style="text-align: center;"
|-
!
!Total
! Home
! Away
|-
|align=left| Games played          || 65 || 33 || 32
|-
|align=left| Games won             || 27 || 18 || 9
|-
|align=left| Games drawn           || 19 || 8 || 11
|-
|align=left| Games lost            || 19 || 7 || 12
|-
|align=left| Biggest win           || 4–0 v Coritiba4–0 v Rio Branco–AC || 4–0 v Coritiba4–0 v Rio Branco–AC || 4–1 v Fluminense
|-
|align=left| Biggest loss          || 2–6 v Vitória || 1–3 v Palmeiras1–3 v Corinthians || 2–6 v Vitória
|-
|align=left| Clean sheets          || 22 || 16 || 6
|-
|align=left| Goals scored          || 98 || 59 || 39
|-
|align=left| Goals conceded        || 83 || 35 || 48
|-
|align=left| Goal difference       || +15 || +24 || -9
|-
|-
|-
|align=left| Most appearances     || Madson (63) || Madson (32) || Madson (31)
|-
|align=left| Top scorer          || Kléber Pereira (28) || Neymar (12) || Kléber Pereira (17)
|-
|align=left| Worst discipline      || Fabão  (18) || Fabão  (11) || Germano  (10)
|-
|align=left| Points               || 100/195 (%) || 62/99 (%) || 38/96 (%)
|-
|align=left| Winning rate         || (%) || (%) || (%)
|-

Campeonato Brasileiro

League table

Results summary

Results by round

Matches

Campeonato Paulista

Results summary

First stage

League table

Results by round

Matches

Knockout stage

Semi-finals

Finals

Copa do Brasil

First round

Second round

References

External links
Official Website
Official Youtube Channel

Santos
2009